Boges was a Persian official and military commander, who functioned as governor (hyparchos) of Eion in Thrace (Achaemenid satrapy of Skudra) under the King of Kings Xerxes I (486–465 BC). According to Herodotus, following the Persian defeats at Plataea and Mycale, Boges refused to abandon Eion when it was besieged by the Athenians and Cimon (son of Miltiades) in 476/5. When he perhaps could have surrendered the town and marched out safely, Boges decided to endure till the end, as he wished not to suffer the ignominy of falling into the enemy’s hands. When the provisions of Eion had finally run out during the protracted siege, Boges built a large fire, killed his wife, children, concubines and servants, and threw them into the fire. He then reportedly collected all pieces of silver and gold that were stored in Eion and threw them into the river Strymon. He then threw himself onto the fire. Boges was highly honored by Xerxes I for his valiance and loyalty, and even Herodotus himself concurred. When Herodotus wrote his Histories in the second half of the fifth century BC, Boges was still praised by the Persians for his deeds. The children of Boges who survived within the Achaemenid Empire were also greatly honoured by Xerxes I.

References

Sources
 
 
 
 
 

5th-century BC Iranian people
5th-century BC deaths
Persian people of the Greco-Persian Wars
Military leaders of the Achaemenid Empire
Achaemenid Thrace
Suicides by self-immolation
Achaemenid officials
Xerxes I